
This is a list of golfers who graduated from the Korn Ferry Tour and Korn Ferry Tour Finals in 2019. The top 25 players on the Korn Ferry Tour's regular-season points list in 2019 earned PGA Tour cards for 2020. The Finals, which concluded on September 2, determined the other 25 players to earn PGA Tour cards and the initial priority order of all 50.

As in previous seasons, the Finals featured the top 75 players on the Korn Ferry Tour regular season points list, players ranked 126–200 on the PGA Tour's regular-season FedEx Cup points list (except players exempt through other means), non-members of the PGA Tour with enough regular-season FedEx Cup points to place 126–200, and special medical exemptions.

To determine the initial 2020 PGA Tour priority rank, the 25 Korn Ferry Tour regular-season graduates were alternated with the 25 Finals graduates. This priority order was then reshuffled several times during the 2020 season.

Scottie Scheffler was fully exempt for the 2020 PGA Tour season after leading both the full-season and the Finals points list.

2019 Korn Ferry Tour Finals

*PGA Tour rookie in 2020
†First-time PGA Tour member in 2020, but ineligible for rookie status due to having played eight or more PGA Tour events as a professional in a previous season
 Earned spot in Finals through PGA Tour.
 Earned spot in Finals through FedEx Cup points earned as a PGA Tour non-member.
 Earned spot in Finals through a medical extension.
 Indicates whether the player earned his card through the regular season or through the Finals.

Results on 2020 PGA Tour

*PGA Tour rookie in 2020
†First-time PGA Tour member in 2020, but ineligible for rookie status due to having played eight or more PGA Tour events in a previous season
 Promoted out of the graduate category for 2021: won or finished in the top 125 of the FedEx Cup points list.
 Remains in the graduate category for 2021: finished outside the top 125 on FedEx Cup list.

Winners on the PGA Tour in 2020

Runners-up on the PGA Tour in 2020

References

External links
Korn Ferry Tour official site

Korn Ferry Tour
PGA Tour
Korn Ferry Tour Finals graduates
Korn Ferry Tour Finals graduates